Basic or BASIC may refer to:

Science and technology
 BASIC, a computer programming language
 Basic (chemistry), having the properties of a base
 Basic access authentication, in HTTP

Entertainment
 Basic (film), a 2003 film
 Basic, one of the languages in Star Wars

Music
 Basic (Robert Quine and Fred Maher album), 1984
 Basic (Glen Campbell album), 1978
 Basic (Brown Eyed Girls album), 2015
 B.A.S.I.C. (Alpinestars album), 2000
 B.A.S.I.C. (The Basics album), 2019

Places
 Basic, Mississippi, a community in the US
 BASIC countries, Brazil, South Africa, India and China in climate change negotiations

Organizations
 BASIC Bank Limited, government owned bank in Bangladesh
 Basic Books, an American publisher

Other uses
 Basic (cigarette), a brand of cigarettes manufactured by the Altria Group (Philip Morris Company)
 Basic (dance move), the dance move that defines the character of a particular dance
 Basic (slang), a "mainstream woman" in American popular culture
 British American Security Information Council, a think tank based in London
 Bašić, South Slavic surname
 BASIC countries

See also
 Basic English, an English-based controlled language with a limited vocabulary
 Visual Basic (classic), a computer programming language
 Visual Basic .NET, a computer programming language based on the .NET Framework
 Basics (disambiguation)
 Base (disambiguation)
 Bassic (Martin "Bassic" Lindhe, born 1971), Swedish musician and composer
 Basis (disambiguation)